Zalvia is an alternative rock/folk rock band, from Mexico City, Mexico, formed in 2008 by friends Antonio Torres (lead vocals, guitars), Yonatán Barrueta (guitars), Miguel Rincón (drums), Omar Mundo (bass) and Marco Antonio Villanueva (saxophone). The name is a variation of Salvia divinorum.

They are well known in their country for their contemporary sounds of rock, based on sounds of the 1970s, from bands like The Doors, and also including sounds from their folk roots.

One year later, Zalvia's line-up changed, keeping Antonio Torres and Yonatán Barrueta as the only constant members and adding Roberto "Rober" Serrano (bass), Mariana Inés López (percussion), Fernando Torres (saxophone), Luis "Lucho" Garay (trumpet), Victor Osorio (keyboards), and Luis Alvarado (drums).

They have released two EPs, Zalvia (2008) and En vivo (2009). Their first album is to be released in 2010.

History

United initially by their common love for The Doors, Zalvia have shown over the years a growing interest in the composition of fusion folk roots, especially those working during the 1970s movement of alternative rock. Between these two related and creative filter verses revelation valuable emotional debate his music, a rock of the past but undeniable bond developed with rigor and freshness, plus an exceptional flexibility that has allowed them to maintain a healthy pace of edits.

Since the middle of 2009, it is one of the indie rock groups most active in Mexico. They played in front of a sold-out crowd at the Auditorio Nacional's Lunario, Hard Rock Cafe and many Latin Music Festivals.

Discography

Zalvia (2008)
X (Single)
Tierra Santa
En vivo (2009)
Tirar a matar (Single)
Soledad
Aire
Demonio azul
Hombres de mundo
Fusión
Cielo gris

References

Musical groups established in 2008
Mexican rock music groups